Terry Leyden (born 1 October 1945) is an Irish former Fianna Fáil politician who served as a Senator (elected on the Labour Panel) from September 2002 to March 2020, and previously during December 1992 (after being nominated by the Taoiseach). He served as a Teachta Dála (TD) from 1977 to 1992, and as a Minister of State from March to December 1982, and from 1987 to 1992.

He was elected to Roscommon County Council in 1974, and re-elected in 1979 and 1985. Leyden was elected to Dáil Éireann at his first attempt, in the 1977 general election, when he was returned to the 21st Dáil as a TD for the Roscommon–Leitrim constituency. He was returned for the new Roscommon constituency at the 1981 general election, and re-elected a further four times before losing his seat at the 1992 general election in the new Longford–Roscommon constituency.

From March to December 1982, he served as Minister of State at the Department of Transport and Minister of State at the Department of Posts and Telegraphs. He then served as Minister of State at the Department of Health from 1987 to 1989, and as Minister of State at the Department of Industry and Commerce from 1989 to 1992.

Following his Dáil defeat he sat very briefly in the 19th Seanad, having been nominated by the Taoiseach Albert Reynolds on 2 December 1992. After the 19th Seanad last sat on 17 December 1992 he stood unsuccessfully in the 1993 election to Seanad Éireann on the Administrative Panel, and was unsuccessful again in 1997 when seeking election on the Industrial and Commercial Panel.

Leyden was re-elected to Roscommon County Council in 1999, a position that he held until the ending of the dual mandate in 2003 – because by that time he was also a Senator – when his seat was taken by his daughter Orla Leyden. Leyden was also a member of the Western Health Board from 1992 to 2002, and was Chairman from 2001 to 2002.

He was elected to the 22nd Seanad on the Labour Panel in September 2002 and re-elected in 2007, 2011 and 2016. He was the Fianna Fáil Seanad spokesperson on Children and European Affairs.

In May 2010, he invoked Parliamentary privilege and accused The Irish Times columnist Fintan O'Toole of incitement to riot, which O'Toole denied. This came about as a result of the latter's addressing of a demonstration against the bank bailouts proposed by the Government, which later turned violent.

In July 2013, he claimed that Adolf Hitler and Benito Mussolini were "good Christians" while speaking in the Seanad. On realising the absurd nature of his comments, he apologised to the chair and admitted he was distracted.

He was a member of the Royal Institute of the Architects of Ireland by virtue of inclusion on the "Minister's List". Prior to his inclusion on the RIAI register he was a member of the Irish Architects Society, the majority of whose members did not have formal qualifications for entry on the architect's register.

He was the Fianna Fáil Seanad spokesperson on Communications, Climate Change and Natural Resources. He retired from politics at the 2020 Seanad election.

References

External links

 

1945 births
Living people
Alumni of the University of Galway
Fianna Fáil TDs
Local councillors in County Roscommon
Members of the 21st Dáil
Members of the 22nd Dáil
Members of the 23rd Dáil
Members of the 24th Dáil
Members of the 25th Dáil
Members of the 26th Dáil
Members of the 19th Seanad
Members of the 22nd Seanad
Members of the 23rd Seanad
Members of the 24th Seanad
Members of the 25th Seanad
Ministers of State of the 23rd Dáil
Ministers of State of the 25th Dáil
Ministers of State of the 26th Dáil
Nominated members of Seanad Éireann
Fianna Fáil senators